Bernhard Rassinger (30 August 1963) is an Austrian former cyclist. He won the Austrian National Road Race Championships in 1985.

References

External links
 

1963 births
Living people
Austrian male cyclists
People from Sankt Pölten
Sportspeople from Lower Austria
20th-century Austrian people